M3 motorway may refer to:

 M3 motorway or Riverside Expressway, part of the Pacific Motorway in Brisbane, Queensland, Australia
 M3 motorway (Great Britain), a motorway in England
 M3 motorway (Hungary), a motorway in Hungary
 M3 motorway in the Republic of Ireland, part of the N3 national primary road
 M3 motorway (Northern Ireland), an urban motorway in Belfast, Northern Ireland
 M3 motorway (Pakistan)

See also
 M-3 (Michigan highway), a state highway in the Detroit metropolitan area
 M3 (Cape Town), an expressway in Cape Town, South Africa
 M3 highway (Russia), another name for the Ukraine Highway in Russia
 Eastern Freeway (Melbourne) or EastLink (Melbourne) in Victoria, Australia, both of which are numbered as M3